Torger Nergård, also spelled Nergaard (born 12 December 1974) is a Norwegian curler from Oslo.

Career
Nergård has curled professionally since 1987 and currently plays third for Team Thomas Ulsrud. At the Junior level, he played third at the 1991 and 1992 World Junior Curling Championships for Thomas Due, and skipped his own team in 1996. Nergård was the alternate for Pål Trulsen's team when Norway won the gold medal at the 2002 Winter Olympics and the 2005 European Curling Championships.

With Team Ulsrud, Nergård played lead in 1997, second in 1998, and third in 2000, 2002–2003 and 2006–2010; the latter years saw the team winning six World Curling Tour events, four European Curling Championship medals (silver in 2007 and 2008; bronze in 2002 and 2009), three World Curling Championship bronze medals (2006, 2008 and 2009), and silver at the 2010 Vancouver Winter Olympics.

Nergård competed as skip during the 2010 World Curling Championship in Cortina d'Ampezzo, Italy, when Thomas Ulsrud had to return home for family reasons. Team Nergård won the silver medal having played some memorable matches, including a 9–8 win against Canada's Team Kevin Koe in the final round-robin game, which placed Norway first in the rankings (10–1), and a 9–7 win against Scotland's Team Warwick Smith in the semi-final. On the strength of Norway's national team during the tournament, Nergård commented that "it wasn't easy coming into the championship without Tom [Ulsrud], but I think we have shown that we can play well. We are a small nation, and there are not many curlers compared to the choice in Canada." At the closing ceremony of the championship, Nergård was honoured by his fellow competitors with the 2010 Colin Campbell Memorial Award, a recognition given to an athlete who "by deed and action in the course of their performance, best exemplified the traditional curling values of skill, honesty, fair play, friendship and sportsmanship."

Following 2010, the team would not medal again at the World Championships, but they did win back-to-back golds at the European Curling Championships in 2010 and 2011 and won silver in 2012.

Personal life
Nergård is married to fellow curler Marianne Rørvik and has two children. He is employed as an engineer with Goodtech Projects and Services.

Teams

References

External links
 
 
 
 
 Complete coverages of Team Norway's Olympics performances at the official Vancouver Olympic Games 2010 Channel
 Team Ulsrud in training on Eurosport Norge. "EurosportNorge møter curlinggutta". 4 December 2009.
 Team Norway interviewed on Grand Slam of Curling. Olympic Curling – Team Norway. 17 February 2010.

Curlers at the 2002 Winter Olympics
Curlers at the 2006 Winter Olympics
Curlers at the 2010 Winter Olympics
Curlers at the 2014 Winter Olympics
Curlers at the 2018 Winter Olympics
Norwegian male curlers
Olympic curlers of Norway
Olympic silver medalists for Norway
Olympic gold medalists for Norway
Living people
1974 births
Olympic medalists in curling
Medalists at the 2010 Winter Olympics
Medalists at the 2002 Winter Olympics
World curling champions
Sportspeople from Oslo
Sportspeople from Trondheim
Continental Cup of Curling participants
European curling champions
Curlers at the 2022 Winter Olympics